Sunburn is the third album by the Blake Babies, released in 1990 (see 1990 in music).

Critical reception
MusicHound Rock: The Essential Album Guide wrote that "Strohm's guitar sound—mixing electric sinew and acoustic jangle—is at its apex here." The Spin Alternative Record Guide called the album "easily the best record any of the Blake Babies had anything to do with."

Track listing

Personnel
Juliana Hatfield - vocals and bass
John Strohm - guitar and vocals
Freda Love (also known as Freda Boner) - Drums

Production
Producers: Gary Smith
Engineers: Steve Haigler
Design: Lane Wurster
Artwork: Susan Huffman
Photography: Jeanne Marie Head

References

Blake Babies albums
1990 albums
Albums produced by Gary Smith (record producer)